"Jonah" is a song by American rapper Kanye West from his tenth studio album Donda (2021). The song features American rappers Vory and Lil Durk, marking their first collaborations with Kanye, along with additional background vocals from frequent West collaborator Ty Dolla $ign. It peaked at number 27 on the Billboard Hot 100 chart and made the top ten on the Billboard Christian Songs and Gospel Songs charts.

Background
West announced a release date of July 24, 2020 and posted a track listing for the album. "Jonah" began as a solo Vory track dedicated to Jonah Ware, a rapper from Louisville who was fatally shot and killed on August 8, 2020. Vory posted a snippet of the song on his Instagram on August 17, 2020. The song was first played at the Donda Mercedes-Benz Stadium listening party on July 23, 2021 with no vocals from West. The subsequent second listening party on August 5, 2021 at the same stadium premiered West's verse on the track.

Summary
"Jonah", the seventh track off of Donda, the album that saw the reunification of Jay-Z and Kanye, begins with Lil Durk celebrating that moment, but then lamenting "I lost my brother when we was millionaires / I wasn't scared to die, but him, that was my biggest fear." Kanye West is seen as connecting his issues to God's mysterious behavior throughout the album. "Jonah" sees Kanye rapping about his relationship with God, alongside fellow rappers Vory and Lil Durk opening up about their pain of losing friends and family members, respectively. Durk's verse is dedicated to his brother, DThang, who was murdered in 2021. The Guardian said in a review of the song that Lil Durk powerfully references a nephew and a niece now without a father, and goes on to say that "West clearly inspires frank admissions from all of the featured artists on Donda, who treat him like a priest they’ve visited for a group therapy session."

The song paints a portrait of isolation, abandonment, and being in need with lyrics such as "Who's there when I need a shoulder to lean on?" and "I hope you're here when I need the demons to be gone."

Reception
Donda was one of the most discussed albums of 2021, and likewise many there have been many reviews of "Jonah". The theme of the song, loneliness and isolation, has been noted as being particularly well portrayed, making the song easily relatable. Charlie Recchia of The Maneater called the song "an emotionally devastating track that discusses fighting inner demons and how lonely that process can be, even if you are a star" and said that "the ghostly hook on this song always gives me chills." A Gigwise reviewer called the track "perfectly serviceable Ye cuts that follow the cookie cutter pattern of interesting features and Yeezy rapping about his relationship with God."

Credits and personnel
Credits adapted from Spotify.

 Kanye West – writer, producer, performer
 Lil Durk – writer, producer
 Michael Suski – writer
 Mike Dean – writer, producer
 Tahrence Brown – writer
 Vory – writer
 Wheezy – writer, producer
 DrtWrk – producer
 Audi – producer

Charts

Weekly charts

Year-end charts

References

2021 songs
Kanye West songs
Lil Durk songs
Song recordings produced by Kanye West
Song recordings produced by Mike Dean (record producer)
Songs written by Kanye West
Songs written by Lil Durk
Songs written by Mike Dean (record producer)
Songs written by Wheezy (record producer)
Songs written by Vory